Aletheia (minor planet designation: 259 Aletheia) is a very large main-belt asteroid that was discovered by German–American astronomer Christian Peters on June 28, 1886, at Litchfield Observatory, Clinton, New York. The dark and heterogeneously composed X-type (Tholen: CP-type) asteroid contains primitive carbonaceous materials, responsible for its low albedo of 0.04. Aletheia measures about 185 kilometers in diameter and belongs to the largest asteroids of the main-belt. It has a semi-major axis of 3.1 AU and an orbit inclined by 11 degrees with a period of 5.55 years.

Richard P. Binzel and Schelte Bus further added to the knowledge about this asteroid in a lightwave survey published in 2003. This project was known as Small Main-belt Asteroid Spectroscopic Survey, Phase II  or SMASSII, which built on a previous survey of the main-belt asteroids. The visible-wavelength (0.435-0.925 micrometre) spectra data was gathered between August 1993 and March 1999.

Lightcurve data has also been recorded by observers at the Antelope Hill Observatory, which has been designated as an official observatory by the Minor Planet Center.

It is named after the Greek goddess of truth, Aletheia, the daughter of Zeus and one of the nurses of Apollo.

References

External links 
 Lightcurve plot of (259) Aletheia, Antelope Hills Observatory
 The Asteroid Orbital Elements Database
 Minor Planet Discovery Circumstances
 Asteroid Lightcurve Data File
 
 

000259
Aletheia
Aletheia
CP-type asteroids (Tholen)
X-type asteroids (SMASS)
18860628